Paladina is a comune (municipality) in the Province of Bergamo in the Italian region of Lombardy, located about  northeast of Milan and about  northwest of Bergamo.

Paladina borders the following municipalities: Almè, Almenno San Bartolomeo, Almenno San Salvatore, Bergamo, Sorisole, Valbrembo. Part of Paladina's territory is included in Parco dei Colli di Bergamo and is crossed by river Quisa.

People 

 Elena Cattaneo, 1962, Italian academic and life senator.

References